Metropolis Gold is the only album by Brooklyn hip hop duo All City, released on November 3, 1998 by MCA Records. The album featured an all-star production lineup, including many prominent New York City producers such as DJ Premier, Pete Rock, Rockwilder, Fredro Starr, DJ Clark Kent, Hitmen member Ron "Amen-Ra" Lawrence, and EZ Elpee. It features guest appearances from rappers Native Souls and Onyx, which served as executive producers on the album.

Metropolis Gold peaked at #42 on the Top R&B/Hip Hop Albums and #18 on the Top Heatseekers. The album features two the Billboard singles: "The Actual" and "The Hot Joint". DJ Premier-produced single "The Actual" peaked at number 3 on the Hot Rap Singles for 23 weeks, making the song the most hit song of the duo to date.

The album was not commercially successful, not selling enough copies to reach the Billboard 200. After the release of it, the duo disbanded without further releases. Greg Valentine continues to perform and record with other rap artists, but it's not known what J.Mega is doing today.

Track listing

Album singles

Videos 
Abdul Malik Abbott shot all 3 videos:
 1998: "The Actual"
 1998: "Priceless"
 1998: "The Hot Joint (Remix)"

Album chart positions

Weekly charts

Singles chart positions

References

External links
 Metropolis Gold at Discogs
 Metropolis Gold at RapGenius
 
 
 

1998 debut albums
MCA Records albums
East Coast hip hop albums
Albums produced by DJ Premier
Albums produced by Pete Rock